The wives of the rulers of the Kingdom of Poland were duchesses or queens consort of Poland. Two women ruled Poland as queens regnant, but their husbands were kings jure uxoris.

Wives of early Polish monarchs

Duchesses of the Polans

Queens and High Duchesses of Poland

Piast Dynasty (1)

Přemyslid Dynasty

Piast Dynasty (2)

Angevin Dynasty

Jagiellon Dynasty

Royal consort of the Polish–Lithuanian Commonwealth 

Elżbieta Szydłowska (1748–1810) was the lover of King Stanisław August. Some believe that she married the King of Poland in 1783, but their marriage was morganatic, so she wasn't Queen of Poland. However, there is no known reason for the marriage to have been morganatic, as Poniatowski's Pacta conventa required him to marry a Polish noblewoman, a requirement she satisfied, and there is no evidence that the marriage ever occurred. According to Wirydianna Fiszerowa, a contemporary who knew them both, the rumour only arose after the death of Poniatowski, was generally disbelieved, and was in fact circulated by Elżbieta herself.

See also

 Royal coronations in Poland
 Royal Coronations at Wawel Cathedral
 Dukes of Greater Poland
 Dukes of Masovia
 Dukes of Pomerania
 Dukes of Sieradz-Łęczyca
 Dukes of Silesia
 List of Galician rulers
 List of royal consorts of Partitioned Poland

Notes

 
 
Polish consorts
Consorts
Consorts
Poland